Ana Isabel Alonso Nieto (born 16 August 1963 in Villaherreros, Palencia) is a former long-distance runner from Spain, who represented her native country in three Summer Olympics: 1988, 1996 and 2000. Her best finish came at her Olympic debut in Seoul, South Korea, where Alonso ended up in 25th place in the women's 10.000 metres race. In Atlanta, Georgia and Sydney, Australia she ran the marathon, finishing in 49th (2:44:12) and 30th (2:36.45) place. In 2000, she won the Rotterdam Marathon.

She is a one-time national champion in the women's 5.000 metres and was the winner of the second edition of the Cross Internacional de Soria meeting. She also won the Cross Internacional de Venta de Baños three times, more than any other female athlete.

Achievements

References

External links
 

1963 births
Living people
Spanish female long-distance runners
Athletes (track and field) at the 1988 Summer Olympics
Athletes (track and field) at the 1996 Summer Olympics
Athletes (track and field) at the 2000 Summer Olympics
Olympic athletes of Spain
Athletes (track and field) at the 1987 Mediterranean Games
Mediterranean Games competitors for Spain
20th-century Spanish women